Patrícia Fischerová (born 26 August 1993) is a Slovak footballer who plays as a defender and has appeared for the Slovakia women's national team.

Career
Fischerová has been capped for the Slovakia national team, appearing for the team during the 2019 FIFA Women's World Cup qualifying cycle.

References

External links
 
 
 

1993 births
Living people
Slovak women's footballers
Slovakia women's international footballers
Women's association football defenders
Expatriate women's footballers in Poland
Slovak expatriate sportspeople in Poland
KKS Czarni Sosnowiec players